Mother tongue usually refers to the language that a person learned as a child at home or a person's first language 

Mother tongue may also refer to:

Proto-Human language, the hypothetical most recent common ancestor of all the world's languages
The Mother Tongue (book), a history of the English language by Bill Bryson
Mother Tongue (journal), a periodical published by the Association for the Study of Languages in Prehistory
Mother Tongue (film), a 1993 film featuring Craig Parker
Mother Tongue Publishing, a Canadian publisher

In music:
Mother Tongue (band), an American rock band co-founded by guitarist Jesse Tobias
"Mother Tongue" (Bring Me the Horizon song), a song by Bring Me the Horizon from Amo
 "Mother Tongue", a song by Dead Can Dance from The Serpent's Egg
Native Tongue (Poison album), 1993, Bret Michaels, Richie Kotzen, Bobby Dall, Rikki Rokket.

See also
Father Tongue hypothesis
Native Tongue Title